Kasongo Lunda Airport is an airport serving the town of Kasongo Lunda in Kwango Province, Democratic Republic of the Congo.

See also

 Transport in the Democratic Republic of the Congo
 List of airports in the Democratic Republic of the Congo

References

External links
OpenStreetMap - Kasongo Lunda

Airports in Kwango